NPF may refer to:

 Naga People's Front, a regional political party in Nagaland and Manipur, India
National Park Foundation
 The National Patriotic Front (Zimbabwe), a political party in Zimbabwe
The National Policy Forum of the British Labour Party
The National Press Foundation
National Pro Fastpitch, an American professional women's softball league
 NPF (firewall), NetBSD's new stateful packet filter
The Network Processing Forum
 National Progressive Front (Iraq)
 National Progressive Front (Syria)
The National Psoriasis Foundation
 Neopentylene fluorophosphate, an acetylcholinesterase inhibitor
 Neuropsychiatric Forum
Nigeria Police Force
Nikos' Pokémon Forum
 Nineveh Plain Forces, a military organization formed in 2015 by indigenous Assyrian Christians in Iraq
 North Preston's Finest